The Apalache Mill, now the Lofts by the Lake, is a historic textile mill at 2200 Racing Road in Apalache, South Carolina.  The main mill building, a three-story brick building with plain late-19th century styling, sits at the southern end of Apalachee Lake, created by damming the Tyger River at a narrow gorge just to the east.  Built in 1888, it is one of the first mills to be built in the Spartanburg area, and remained in active service until 2007.

The mill was listed on the National Register of Historic Places in 2015.  The listing includes the mill and associated water power infrastructure, including a water tower and the lake.

See also
National Register of Historic Places listings in Spartanburg County, South Carolina

References

External links 
 Lofts by the Lake apartments

Textile mills in South Carolina
Industrial buildings and structures on the National Register of Historic Places in South Carolina
Buildings and structures in Spartanburg, South Carolina
National Register of Historic Places in Spartanburg, South Carolina
Apartment buildings in South Carolina